This is a list of dams and reservoirs in Catalonia, Spain.

List
List of dams and reservoirs by the Catalan Water Agency:

See also 
 List of dams and reservoirs
 List of dams and reservoirs in Spain

References

External links

Catalan Water Agency Official Website
State of reservoirs of internal basins with a capacity greater than 2 hm³
Water reservoirs in Catalonia - Weekly summary of reservoirs   - Ministerio de Agricultura, Alimentación y Medio Ambiente

Dams Reservoirs

Catalonia
Catalonia